Schultze & Weaver was an architecture firm established in New York City in 1921. The partners were Leonard Schultze and S. Fullerton Weaver.

History
Leonard B. Schultze was born in Chicago, Illinois, on December 5, 1877.  He was educated at the City College of New York and ranks high among the most successful pupils of Franco-American architect Emmanuel Louis Masqueray, founder of the Atelier Masqueray.  Schultze had been an employee of the firm of Warren & Wetmore, and during his twenty years in that company's office he had worked on the designs for such projects as New York's Grand Central Terminal. 

Weaver's primary responsibilities in the new firm were in engineering, business, and real estate. Schultze & Weaver's first major commission was from John McEntee Bowman's Biltmore Hotels, for the large Los Angeles hotel today known as the Millennium Biltmore. 
 
Their later work included several other projects for the same company, including the  Atlanta Biltmore Hotel, and the Coral Gables Biltmore Hotel. The firm also designed the Breakers Hotel in Palm Beach and the Miami Nautilus Hotel.  In addition to their work outside New York, they designed several noted landmark hotels within the city, including The Park Lane Hotel, The Lexington Hotel (now the Radisson Lexington Hotel), The Pierre Hotel and its neighbor, the Sherry-Netherland. Schultze & Weaver architect Lloyd Morgan (1892–1970), in 1929, designed the Waldorf-Astoria Hotel which, upon its completion in 1931, was the world's largest, with 2,200 rooms. Schultze & Weaver redesigned and renovated the Grand Ballroom in New York City's Plaza Hotel in the autumn of 1929.

Though best known for their work on luxury hotels, Schultze & Weaver also designed schools, hospitals, residential developments, and office buildings such as the 1925 New York headquarters of the J.C. Penney Company.  Among their other buildings are the Hunter-Dulin building on Sutter Street in San Francisco and Miami's Freedom Tower. They also designed the U.S. Post Office at Scarsdale, New York as consulting architects for the Office of the Supervising Architect.

After Weaver died in 1940 Schultze reorganized the firm under the name Leonard Schultze and Associates.  During this period the firm designed three large apartment complexes for the Metropolitan Life Insurance Company, and a fourth that served as housing for United Nations employees in New York.  These are listed below.

Selected commissions
As Schultze & Weaver:

 1922 Los Angeles Biltmore Hotel, Los Angeles, California
 1922 Park Lane Apartment Hotel, Manhattan, New York City
 1923 Hellman Commercial Trust & Savings Bank Building, Los Angeles
 1923 Jonathan Club, Los Angeles
 1924 Atlanta Biltmore Hotel, Atlanta, Georgia
 1924 Hotel Sevilla-Biltmore, Havana, Cuba
 1924 Pacific Mutual Garage, Los Angeles
 1925 Coral Gables Biltmore Hotel, Coral Gables, Florida
 1925 Breakers Hotel, Palm Beach, Florida
 1925 Hunter-Dulin Building, San Francisco, California
 1925 J. C. Penney Co. Building (330 West 34th Street), Manhattan
 1925 Miami Daily News Tower (Freedom Tower), Miami, Florida
 1925 Subway Terminal Building, Los Angeles
 1926 Sherry-Netherland Hotel, Manhattan
 1926 Ingraham Building, Miami
 1926 Montauk Manor, Montauk, New York
 1928 Brisbane House, Manhattan
 1929 News-Sun Building, Springfield, Ohio
 1929 Hotel Pierre, Manhattan
 1929 Plaza Hotel Ballroom, Manhattan
 1929 Lexington Hotel, Manhattan
 1931 Fifth Avenue Bank Building, Manhattan
 1931 Waldorf-Astoria Hotel, Manhattan
 1937 United States Post Office, Scarsdale, New York

As Leonard Schultze and Associates, for the Metropolitan Life Insurance Company:

 1941 Parkfairfax, Alexandria, Virginia
 1944 Parkmerced, San Francisco
 1944 Park La Brea, Los Angeles

As Leonard Schultze and Associates, as housing for the new United Nations:

 1948 Parkway Village, Kew Gardens Hills, Queens, New York City

References
Notes

Bibliography
 Lamonaca, Marianne and Mogul, Jonathan (eds.) Grand Hotels of the Jazz Age; the Architecture of Schultze & Weaver. New York: Princeton Architectural Press, 2005. .

External links
 
 "It's De Limit", Forbes article by Finn-Olaf Jones on Schulze & Weaver, April 24, 2006
 Metropolis Magazine story on Schultze and Weaver
 Wolfsonian exhibit on Schultze and Weaver

Defunct architecture firms based in New York City